Kenneth Braaten (born 24 September 1974) is a Norwegian nordic combined skier who competed from 1994 to 2005. He won the 4 x 5 km team event at the 1998 Winter Olympics in Nagano. Braaten also won two medals in the 4 x 5 km team event at the FIS Nordic World Ski Championships with a gold in 2001 and a silver in 1999.

External links 
 
 

1974 births
People from Rana, Norway
Living people
Norwegian male Nordic combined skiers
Nordic combined skiers at the 1998 Winter Olympics
Olympic gold medalists for Norway
Olympic medalists in Nordic combined
FIS Nordic World Ski Championships medalists in Nordic combined
Medalists at the 1998 Winter Olympics
Sportspeople from Nordland
20th-century Norwegian people